Nicolás Gómez Dávila (18 May 1913 – 17 May 1994) was a Colombian conservative philosopher and aphorist.

Gómez Dávila's fame began to spread only in the last few years before his death, particularly by way of German translations of his works. He was one of the most radical critics of modernity whose work consists almost entirely of aphorisms which he called "escolios" ("scholia" or "glosses").

Biography 
Gómez Dávila was a Colombian scholar who spent most of his life in the circle of his friends and within the confines of his library. He belonged to the upper circles of Colombian society and was educated in Paris. Due to severe pneumonia, he spent about two years at home where he was taught by private teachers and developed a lifelong love of classical literature. He never, however, attended a university. In the 1930s he went back from Paris to Colombia, never to visit Europe again, except for a six-month stay with his wife in 1948. He built up an immense library containing more than 30,000 volumes around which his literary existence centred. In 1948 he helped found the University of The Andes in Bogotá.

In 1954, Gómez Dávila's first volume of works was published by his brother, a compilation of notes and aphorisms under the title Notas I – the second volume of which never appeared. The book remained virtually unknown because only 100 copies were printed and these were presented as gifts to his friends.  In 1959, he followed this with a small book of essays under the title of Textos I (again, no second volume was published).  These essays develop basic concepts of his philosophical anthropology as well as his philosophy of history, often in literary language full of metaphors.  In these essays, he first voices his intention to create a "reactionary patchwork" because reality, he said, cannot be represented in a philosophical system.

After the collapse of the military dictatorship in 1958 Gómez Dávila was offered the post of chief advisor to the state president which he rejected as he did with respect to later offers, in 1974, to become ambassador in London. Though he supported the later president Alberto Lleras Camargo's role in bringing down the dictatorship, he refrained from any political activity himself, a decision he had already reached early on in his practice as a writer.

From this decision resulted his strong criticism not only of left-wing but also of right-wing and conservative political practices, even though his explicitly reactionary principles show some similarities to conservative viewpoints. His skeptical anthropology was based on a close study of Thucydides and Jacob Burckhardt as well as his affirmation of hierarchical structures of order on society, state and church. Gómez Dávila emphatically criticised the concept of the sovereignty of the people as an illegitimate divinisation of man and a rejection of the sovereignty of God.  He was likewise deeply critical of the Second Vatican Council which he saw as a problematic adaptation to the world. He particularly deplored the replacement of the Ecclesiastical Latin Tridentine Mass with the vernacular Mass of Paul VI in the wake of the council.  Similar to Juan Donoso Cortés, Gómez Dávila believed that all political errors ultimately resulted from theological errors. That is why his thought can be described as a form of political theology.

The modern ideologies such as liberalism, democracy, and socialism, are the main targets of Gómez Dávila's criticism, because the world influenced by these ideologies appeared to him decadent and corrupt.

Gómez Dávila discussed a vast range of topics, philosophical and theological questions, problems of literature, art, and aesthetics, philosophy of history and the writing of history. He employed a literary method of succinct statements with a great sensibility for matters of style and tone.  The literary method he developed is the gloss, the scholion, which he used to comment on the world, particularly in the five volumes of Escolios a un texto implícito (1977; 1986; 1992) that he published from the seventies to the nineties. He created "the reactionary" as his unmistakable literary mask and made it into a distinctive type of thinking about the modern world as such.  In his later work he attempted to define the "reactionary" with which he identified in an affirmative way by locating him somewhere beyond the traditional position of left and right.  On the basis of a Traditionalist Catholicism influenced by the intellectual probity of Nietzsche and others he criticized modernity and saw himself as a partisan for a "truth that will not die".

Gómez Dávila made no attempts to make his writings widely known.  Only by way of German (and later Italian as well as French and Polish) translation beginning in the late eighties did Gómez Dávila's ideas begin to be read among poets and philosophers such as Robert Spaemann, Martin Mosebach, Botho Strauss, Reinhart Maurer, Rolf Schilling, Heiner Müller, Franco Volpi, Asfa-Wossen Asserate and Krzysztof Urbanek.

Bibliography 
Escolios a Un Texto Implicito: Obra Completa. Nicolas Gomez Davila, Franco Volpi. July 2006. Hardcover, 408 pages. Villegas Editores. , 
Notas I, Mexico 1954 (new edition Bogotá 2003).
Textos I, Bogotá 1959 (new edition Bogotá 2002).
Escolios a un texto implícito, 2 volumes, Bogotá 1977.
Nuevos escolios a un texto implícito, 2 volumes, Bogotá 1986.
De iure, in: Revista del Colegio Mayor de Nuestra Senora del Rosario 81. Jg., Nr. 542 (April–June 1988), p. 67–85.
https://www.academia.edu/34702433/De_Iure_-_Nicol%C3%A1s_G%C3%B3mez_D%C3%A1vila_Bilingual_edition_ De iure, Bilingual Edition, translated by Tomás Molina, in: Revista del Colegio Mayor de Nuestra Senora del Rosario Vl 3., Nr. 39 (September 2017).
Sucesivos escolios a un texto implícito, Santafé de Bogotá 1992 (new edition Barcelona 2002).
El reaccionario auténtico, in: Revista de la Universidad de Antioquia, Nr. 240 (April–June 1995), p. 16–19.
Escolios a un texto implícito. Selección, Bogotá 2001.
Alle origini del mondo, edited by Antonio Lombardi, Villasanta (MB): Limina Mentis, 2013, Translation of Textos I (V) (1959).
Scholia to an Implicit Text. Bilingual Selected Edition. Prologue by Till Kinzel. Villegas Editores, Bogotá 2013,

Notes

Further reading 

AA.VV. Entre Fragmentos. Interpretaciones gomezdavilianas. Alfredo Abad (Comp.) Casa de Asterión Ediciones, Pereira, 2017.
Alfredo Abad Pensar lo Implícito. En Torno a Gómez Dávila. Postergraph, Pereira, 2008
Alfredo Abad  Gómez Dávila y las raíces gnósticas de la modernidad en Revista Ideas y Valores Universidad Nacional No. 142 Bogotá
Nicolás Gómez Dávila Crítica e Interpretación, en Revista de Filosofía Paradoxa No. 14 Universidad Tecnológica de Pereira, 2007.
Hernán D. Caro: El buen odioso – La apoteósis alemana de Nicolás Gómez Dávila, en: Revista Arcadia, enero 2008.
Sergio Knipe: "Anthropotheism: Nicolás Gómez Dávila on Democracy", in: David J. Wingfield (ed.), The Initiate: Journal of Traditional Studies, Issue One, Spring 2008.
José Miguel Oviedo: Breve historia del ensayo hispanoamericano, Madrid 1981, pp. 150–151.
Reinhart Maurer: Reaktionäre Postmoderne – Zu Nicolás Gómez Dávila, in: J. Albertz (ed.): Aufklärung und Postmoderne – 200 Jahre nach der französischen Revolution das Ende aller Aufklärung?, Berlin 1991, pp. 139–50.
Óscar Torres Duque: Nicolás Gómez Dávila: la pasión del anacronismo, in: Boletín Cultural y Bibliográfico 32, No. 40 (1995), pp. 31–49.
Juan Gustavo Cobo Borda: Nicolás Gómez Dávila, un pensador solitario, in: Cobo Borda: Desocupado lector, Bogotá 1996, pp. 94–96.
Franco Volpi: Un angelo prigioniero nel tempo, in: Nicolás Gómez Dávila: In margine a un testo implicito, Milano 2001, pp. 159–83.
Till Kinzel: Vom Sinn des reaktionären Denkens. Zu Nicolás Gómez Dávilas Kulturkritik, in: Philosophisches Jahrbuch 1/2002, pp. 175–85.
Till Kinzel: Nicolás Gómez Dávila. Parteigänger verlorener Sachen, Schnellroda 2003, ²2005, ³2006.
Philippe Billé (ed.): Studia Daviliana. Études sur N. G. D., La Croix-Comtesse 2003.
Reinhart Maurer: Ausnahmslose Gleichheit?, in: Die Ausnahme denken (FS Kodalle), volume 2, ed. by C. Dierksmeier, Würzburg 2003, pp. 165–76.
Vittorio Hösle: Variationen, Korollarien und Gegenaphorismen zum ersten Band der „Escolios a un texto implícito“ von Nicolás Gómez Dávila, in: Die Ausnahme denken, 2003, pp. 149–63.
Till Kinzel: Ein kolumbianischer Guerillero der Literatur. N. G. D.s Ästhetik des Widerstands, in: Germanisch-Romanische Monatsschrift 1/2004, pp. 87–107.
Virgil Nemoianu: Nicolás Gómez Dávila: Parteigänger verlorener Sachen (review), in: MLN – Volume 119, Number 5, December 2004 (Comparative Literature Issue), pp. 1110–1115.
Till Kinzel: Denken als Guerillakampf gegen die Moderne, in https://web.archive.org/web/20070731214655/http://www.aphorismus.net/beitrag17.html
Prawdziwy reakcjonista. Nicolásowi Gómezowi Dávili w stulecie urodzin, Krzysztof Urbanek [red.], Furta Sacra, Warszawa 2013.
Oczyszczenie inteligencji. Nicolás Gómez Dávila – myśliciel współczesny?, Krzysztof Urbanek [red.], Furta Sacra, Warszawa 2010.
Między sceptycyzmem a wiarą. Nicolás Gómez Dávila i jego dzieło, Bogna J. Obidzińska, Krzysztof Urbanek [red., red.], Furta Sacra, Warszawa 2008.
Krzysztof Urbanek, „En torno a Nicolás Gómez Dávila”, Paradoxa. Revista de Filosofía, Nr 14, Diciembre de 2007 (Colombia).
Krzysztof Urbanek, „Nicolás Gómez Dávila – myśliciel świadomie niekonserwatywny”, Cywilizacja, Nr 23/2007.
Krzysztof Urbanek, „EX OCCIDENTE LUX II”, [w:] Nicolás Gómez Dávila, Następne scholia do tekstu implicite, tłum. Krzysztof Urbanek, Wydawnictwo Furta Sacra, Warszawa 2008.
Krzysztof Urbanek, „Nicolás Gómez Dávila i demokracja”, Pro Fide Rege et Lege, 1/2007.
Krzysztof Urbanek, „Nicolás Gómez Dávila – myśliciel nieznany”, [w:] Z myśli hiszpańskiej i iberoamerykańskiej. Filozofia – literatura – mistyka, Dorota Sepczyńska, Mieczysław Jagłowski [red., red.], Instytut Cervantesa w Warszawie, Instytut Filozofii UWM w Olsztynie, Katedra UNESCO UWM w Olsztynie, Wydział Socjologii i Pedagogiki WSIiE TWP w Olsztynie, Olsztyn 2006.
Till Kinzel: Randbemerkungen zu Nicolás Gómez Dávila als Lehrer des Lesens. In: Einfache Formen und kleine Literatur(en). Für Hinrich Hudde zum 65. GEburtstag. Ed. Michaela Weiß / Frauke Bayer, Heidelberg: Winter, 2010, pp. 77–88.
Enver J. Torregroza Lara, Antropología y fenomenología en Nicolás Gómez Dávila In: Pensamiento. Revista de Investigación e Información Filosófica, Vol. 76, No. 291, p. 1153-1171.

External links 

 
 "Annotations on an Implicit Text": the work of Nicolas Gomez-Davila
 The Aphorisms of Nicolas Gomez-Davila
 Gómez Dávila's Website in Facebook
 Don Colacho's Aphorisms PDF
 Don Colacho's Aphorisms, PDF
 Don Colacho's Aphorisms, DOCX
 Leo RodriguezV's Nicolas Gomez Davila Blog, Blogger

1913 births
1994 deaths
Aphorists
Colombian expatriates in France
Colombian male writers
Colombian Roman Catholics
People from Bogotá
Catholic philosophers
Roman Catholic writers
Traditionalist Catholic writers
20th-century Colombian philosophers